Centennial Fountain:

 Centennial Fountain, Chicago
 Centennial Fountain, Oklahoma City
 Centennial Fountain, Seattle University

See also
 Victoria Centennial Fountain